An Young-su (Hangul: 안영수, Hanja: 安榮水; born February 20, 1964, in Seoul, South Korea) is a retired amateur boxer from South Korea, who won the silver medal in the men's welterweight division (–67 kg) at the 1984 Summer Olympics in Los Angeles, California. In the final he was beaten by Mark Breland of the United States.

Results

References

External links
 
 

1964 births
Living people
Sportspeople from Seoul
Boxers at the 1984 Summer Olympics
Welterweight boxers
Olympic boxers of South Korea
Olympic silver medalists for South Korea
Olympic medalists in boxing
South Korean male boxers
Medalists at the 1984 Summer Olympics
20th-century South Korean people